Critical Left (SC) was a communist and Trotskyist political party in Italy, affiliated to the Fourth International.

History 
Originally a Trotskyist faction within the Communist Refoundation Party (PRC), it broke ranks on 8 December 2007 to become an independent political party. From 2006 to 2008, SC had deputy Salvatore Cannavò and senator Franco Turigliatto who voted consistently against the Prodi II Cabinet and the latter was responsible of the first major crisis of the government on 22 February 2007. After this, Turigliatto was expelled from the PRC in March. In the 2008 general election, SC (890 members) ran its own lists and Flavia D'Angeli was chosen as candidate for Prime Minister of the party. In the election, SC gained 0.5% of the national vote.

SC dissolved in July 2013 and agreed to separate into two groupings which would each try out their different approaches, with the first grouping formed a new party called Anticapitalist Left while the second founded Internationalist Solidarity, a political association uninvolved in direct elections.

Leadership 
 Spokespersons: Salvatore Cannavò (2007–2009), Flavia D'Angeli (2008–present), Franco Turigliatto (2009–present) and Piero Maestri (2009–2013)

Electoral results

Parliament

Chamber of Deputies

Senate

References

External links 

 Official website

2007 establishments in Italy
2013 disestablishments in Italy
Anti-Stalinist left
Defunct communist parties in Italy
Political parties disestablished in 2013
Political parties established in 2007
Trotskyist organisations in Italy
Defunct political parties in Italy